A single human poll represents the 1981–82 NCAA Division I women's basketball rankings, the AP Poll, in addition to various publications' preseason polls. The AP poll is currently a poll of sportswriters. The AP conducts polls weekly through the end of the regular season and conference play.

While there was only one major poll this season, championships were conducted under the auspices of both the AIAW and the NCAA. The AIAW champion was Rutgers, while the NCAA champion was Louisiana Tech.

Legend

AP Poll
Source

References

College women's basketball rankings in the United States